The 24th Fighter Aviation Division is a unit of the Chinese People's Liberation Army Air Force. It is headquartered at Yangcun Air Base in the Beijing Military Region. The unit is equipped with J-8 fighters. PLA-AF fighter divisions generally consist of about 17,000 personnel and 70-120 aircraft.

Since 1952 the 24th has shot down three enemy aircraft and many balloons.

Sub Units
24th Fighter Division sub units:
 70th Regiment
 71st Regiment
 72nd Regiment

Notable people
Ding Laihang

See also
 List of Chinese aircraft
 List of Airbases in the PLAAF
 People's Liberation Army Air Force
 People's Liberation Army

References

External links
 24th Fighter Division at GlobalSecurity.org
 PLAAF Order of Battle at Scramble Magazine - Dutch Aviation Society

Aviation Divisions of the People's Liberation Army